SNCAO (abbreviated from Société nationale des constructions aéronautiques de l'ouest) was a state-owned French aircraft manufacturer, which originated on November 16, 1936, from the merger of the factories of Breguet in Bouguenais, and Loire-Nieuport in St Nazaire and Issy-les-Moulineaux.

The company had been formed as one of six state-owned Société Nationales in the 1936 nationalistation of military industries; at the end of 1940 these were re-organised and SNCAO was absorbed by SNCASO. In 1957 SNCASO was merged into Sud Aviation.

Aircraft
 SNCAO 30
 SNCAO 200
 SNCAO CAO.600
 SNCAO CAO.700

References

External links

 SNCAO page on AviaFrance

Defunct aircraft manufacturers of France
Vehicle manufacturing companies established in 1936
Vehicle manufacturing companies disestablished in 1941
French companies established in 1936
1941 disestablishments in France